Claire Maxwell is a sociologist. She currently holds a chair in sociology at the University of Copenhagen.

Early life 
Maxwell was born, and spent her childhood, in Luxembourg. She holds German and Australian citizenship, and is fluent in English, German, French and Danish. She attended the European School in Luxembourg, graduating from its EB programme in 1993.

Education 
Maxwell gained a BA in PPE from The Queen's College, University of Oxford in 1996. She remained at Oxford (Green Templeton College and Department of Social Policy and Intervention) to study for a MSc in Applied Social Studies and a postgraduate Diploma in Social Work (PGDipSW), which qualified her to practise as a social worker in the UK in 1999.

Maxwell subsequently studied for a PhD at Royal Holloway College with a thesis entitled "Gender versus ‘vulnerability’: how they determine young people's sexual and relationship experiences", awarded in 2005. She was supervised by Betsy Stanko.

Career and research 
Maxwell combined her part-time PhD research with employment by Oxfordshire County Council, initially as a social worker, and later as a public health specialist and teenage pregnancy co-ordinator for the county, developing and implementing a strategy to reduce the incidence of teenage pregnancy across Oxfordshire.

After her PhD award, Maxwell was employed by the Institute of Education from 2005, progressing through appointments as researcher and lecturer, before culminating in her appointment as Professor in 2018. She accepted a chair in Sociology at the University of Copenhagen and took up the post in September 2018.

Her broad research interests are concerned with the transnational migration of high-skilled professionals, the sociology of education, and gender and education. Specific current interests include processes of incorporation by international professionals and their families in new countries and work places, convertibility of resources during transnational mobility, internationalisation of education, and the emergence of elite schools around the world. She has been awarded research funding in the UK by the ESRC and in Denmark by the Danish Innovation Fund  and the Independent Research Fund Denmark. 

Her Google Scholar H index is 29.

Books and research publications 

Maxwell's most recent book was published by Routledge  in October 2021. It examines why families travel today – and what happens when they do. Maxwell and her co-authors focus on how social class divergence is forged through movements across borders, and how travel has been influenced by the COVID-19 pandemic and climate change.

Maxwell is currently co-editor of the journal International Studies in Sociology of Education. Her work has appeared in a number of high impact journals, including Sociology,  the British Journal of Sociology of Education,  and Globalisation, Societies and Education.

Media, science communication, and public engagement 
Maxwell was interviewed on BBC Radio 4's Thinking Allowed in 2016.

She regularly uses her Twitter account to discuss her research and highlight new publications. She has appeared on the FreshEd podcast and has also featured on YouTube talking about her research.

Public educational service 

Maxwell has extensive experience of school governance and practical educational policy implementation, at both primary and secondary levels. She has served on the board of Rygaards International School in Copenhagen, and was formerly Chair of Governors at West Oxford Community Primary School in the UK.

Personal life 
Maxwell lives in Gentofte and is married, with two children. She is a committed CrossFit athlete.

The retired figure skater, Olympian and fitness influencer Fleur Maxwell is her sister.

References 

Australian sociologists
German sociologists
Australian women sociologists
German women sociologists
Academic staff of the University of Copenhagen
Alumni of the University of Oxford
Alumni of The Queen's College, Oxford
1975 births
Living people